The 2014 British motorcycle Grand Prix was the twelfth round of the 2014 Grand Prix motorcycle racing season. It was held at the Silverstone Circuit in Silverstone on 31 August 2014.

Classification

MotoGP

Moto2

Moto3

Championship standings after the race (MotoGP)
Below are the standings for the top five riders and constructors after round twelve has concluded.

Riders' Championship standings

Constructors' Championship standings

 Note: Only the top five positions are included for both sets of standings.

References

2014 MotoGP race reports
British Motorcycle Grand Prix
British motorcycle Grand Prix
British motorcycle Grand Prix